Oscoda Township is a charter township of Iosco County in the U.S. state of Michigan.  The population was 6,788 at the 2020 census.  The Wurtsmith Air Force Base is located within the township.

Communities
It is near the Foote Dam Pond along the south side of the Au Sable River
Only a very small portion of the CDP extends into Au Sable Township to the south.

Geography

It is the largest municipality by area in Iosco County.  The Au Sable River flows east through most of the township and contains numerous dams and reservoirs.  The Loud Dam Pond, Cooke Dam Pond, and Foote Dam Pond are along the river.  The Pine River also flows south into the township into Van Etten Lake before joining the Au Sable River slightly before Lake Huron.  Portions of the Manistee National Forest are within the township.

Transportation

Airport
Oscoda–Wurtsmith Airport is a public use airport that was created in 1993 from part of the disestablished Wurtsmith Air Force Base.

Bus
Indian Trails has a station in Oscoda that is along the Owosso–St. Ignace route that follows U.S. Highway 23 at this point.

Major highways
 runs south–north along the eastern edge of the township near Lake Huron.
 runs through the western portion of the township.
 has its southern terminus at US 23 within the township.

Demographics
As of the census of 2000, there were 7,248 people, 3,170 households, and 2,066 families residing in the township. The racial makeup of the township was 95.28% White, 0.80% African American, 1.02% Native American, 0.70% Asian, 0.14% Pacific Islander, 0.41% from other races, and 1.64% from two or more races. Hispanic or Latino of any race were 1.30% of the population.

There were 3,170 households, out of which 25.4% had children under the age of 18 living with them, 52.5% were married couples living together, 9.7% had a female householder with no husband present, and 34.8% were non-families. 29.9% of all households were made up of individuals, and 12.6% had someone living alone who was 65 years of age or older.  The average household size was 2.28 and the average family size was 2.79.

In the township the population was spread out, with 23.3% under the age of 18, 5.7% from 18 to 24, 24.4% from 25 to 44, 27.7% from 45 to 64, and 18.9% who were 65 years of age or older.  The median age was 43 years. For every 100 females, there were 97.7 males.  For every 100 females age 18 and over, there were 95.1 males.

The median income for a household in the township was $31,250, and the median income for a family was $38,457. Males had a median income of $30,439 versus $20,601 for females. The per capita income for the township was $16,312.  About 9.2% of families and 13.4% of the population were below the poverty line, including 19.8% of those under age 18 and 4.4% of those age 65 or over.

Education
Oscoda Township is served entirely by Oscoda Area Schools, which also serves portions of several surrounding townships.  A satellite campus of Alpena Community College is also located within the township.

References

External links
Oscoda Township official website
Au Sable and Oscoda Historical Society

Townships in Iosco County, Michigan
Charter townships in Michigan
Populated places established in 1857
1857 establishments in Michigan
Populated places on Lake Huron in the United States